McIntosh County is a county located in the U.S. state of Georgia. As of the 2020 census, the population was 10,975, a drop of 23.4 percent since the 2010 census. The county seat is Darien.

McIntosh County is included in the Brunswick, GA Metropolitan Statistical Area.

History

Colonial and Revolutionary period 

The area which was formally named McIntosh County was originally settled by the British in 1721 with the construction of Fort King George, which was part of a set of forts built as a buffer between the British colonies to the north and Spanish Florida to the south, under the direction of General James Oglethorpe. New Inverness (later named Darien) was founded in 1736 by Scottish Highlanders who were enticed to move to Georgia by General Oglethorpe. In 1760, the British built Fort Barrington on the north side of the Altamaha River about 12 miles (19 km) northwest of present-day Darien. It was used for decades as a transportation and communication center up and down coastal Georgia. The County split off from Liberty County in 1793. 

The new county was named McIntosh for its most famous family, which included Lachlan McIntosh, who was a general in the Continental Army. The McIntosh clan in Darien dates back to 1736.

Civil War period 

Few Georgia counties suffered during the Civil War as much as McIntosh County. The agricultural loss of the plantations was devastating. Even the lumber industry was destroyed, along with the once-thriving seaport town of Darien, Georgia which was the result of the burning of Darien in the "total war" tactics of James Montgomery in June 1863.

Capture of 26 old men

After the burning of Darien in 1863 under the command of U.S. Army Col. James Montgomery, the area was left mostly defenseless. A group of civilians, generally too old for military service, were the only defense against looting by the U.S. military from the naval blockade boats. The men were meeting at Ebenezer Church on the night of August 3, 1864. A spy told the U.S. military about the meeting. U.S. troops surrounded the church and opened fire. The 26 men were captured, marched to near Darien (about 10 miles away), put on ships and sent to prisons in the north.

Reconstruction 

From the end of the Civil war to Georgia's 1907 disenfranchisement laws, McIntosh County was a base of black political power in the state. "Tunis Campbell was the highest-ranking and most influential African American politician in nineteenth-century Georgia", according to the New Georgia Encyclopedia. In March 1865, Tunis G. Campbell Sr. was put in supervision of land claims at the Freedmen's Bureau for a group of Georgia barrier islands, including Sapelo in McIntosh County. After the land in question was returned to plantation owners by President Andrew Johnson, “Campbell quickly purchased 1,250 acres at Belle Ville in McIntosh County and there established an association of black landowners to divide parcels and profit from the land.”

After the military registration carried out in early 1867, 600 black people and 307 white people were on the voter rolls in McIntosh. 

In late 1867, Campbell was elected as one of two delegates from the second senatorial district – Liberty, McIntosh, and Tattnall counties – to Georgia's constitutional convention. 

In April 1868, Campbell was elected as the state senator for the second district, and his son Tunis G. Campbell Jr. was elected as state representative for McIntosh County. While both Campbells were among the black legislators expelled later in 1868, they were able to return to office in 1871; Campbell Sr. left office in 1872, while Campbell Jr. served until 1874.

Campbell Sr. also served as the Vice President of the Georgia Republican Party. As an elected official, “Campbell [Sr.] organized a black power structure in McIntosh County that protected freed people from white abuses, whether against their bodies or in labor negotiations,” and he was rumored to be protected by a 300-person militia. In fact, that power structure lasted for decades, as evidenced by the fact that the county had three black representatives from 1875 to 1907: Amos R. Rodgers (1878-9), Lectured Crawford (1886-7, 1890-1, 1900-1), and William H. Rogers (1902-7).

Civil rights period
Despite its large number of black residents, McIntosh County politics continued to be dominated by whites well into the 1970s, even following the federal civil rights legislation of the previous decade. In September 1975, the Georgia Legal Services Program, on behalf of the local NAACP, filed suit in United States District Court, alleging that women and blacks were systematically excluded from grand juries responsible for appointing members to the McIntosh County Board of Education. The following May, plaintiffs and county officials reached an agreement providing for random jury selection.

In 1977, the NAACP filed separate suits against McIntosh County and the City of Darien, alleging improper districting for county and city commission seats. The county settled out of court, agreeing to redraw its commission boundaries to include a black-majority district. The NAACP lost its suit against the city, but this decision was remanded and reversed in 1979 by the United States Court of Appeals for the Fifth Circuit.

Praying for Sheetrock: A Work of Nonfiction by Melissa Fay Greene narrates the events surrounding the civil rights movement in McIntosh County, particularly the death of Sheriff Thomas H. Poppell and the 1978 election of black rights activist Thurnell Alston as county commissioner.

Geography

The vast majority of McIntosh County is located in the Ogeechee Coastal sub-basin of the larger Ogeechee basin. The entire southwestern border of the county is located in the Altamaha River sub-basin of the basin by the same name.

Adjacent counties
 Liberty County (north)
 Glynn County (south)
 Wayne County (west)
 Long County (northwest)

National protected areas
 Blackbeard Island National Wildlife Refuge
 Harris Neck National Wildlife Refuge
 Wolf Island National Wildlife Refuge

Islands

 Sapelo Island
 Blackbeard Island
 Four Mile Island
 Creighton Island
 Wolf Island
 Black Island
 Hird Island
 Little Sapelo Island
 Wahoo Island

Transportation

Major highways
  Interstate 95
 
  U.S. Route 17
  State Route 25
  State Route 57
  State Route 99
  State Route 131 (decommissioned)
  State Route 251
  State Route 405

Traffic signals
McIntosh County is noteworthy for being the only county in its area having no cycled traffic lights. There are two flashing lights in the county, however. One is at the four-way stop intersection of US-17 and GA-99 in Eulonia, and the other is at the intersection of US-17 and First Street in downtown Darien. There have been discussions in Darien of placing a traffic signal at the intersection of GA-251 and US-17, as well as at the Interstate 95 exit ramps on GA-251, as traffic flow has increased in Darien in recent years. However, no definite plans have been made in regards to potential future traffic signals.

Railroads
McIntosh County is also one of just a handful of counties in Georgia that no longer has an active railroad. The short-lived Georgia Coast and Piedmont Railroad once ran along present-day SR 99 and SR 57 but was removed by 1919. The more recent Seaboard Coast Line Railroad ran north to south along the western part of the county, through Townsend for most of the twentieth century. However, the track from Riceboro in Liberty County to Seals in Camden County was removed by CSX in the late 1980s, leaving McIntosh County without any railroad track. Evidence of the railroad corridor can still be seen in many areas, though.

Demographics

2010 census
As of the 2010 United States Census, there were 14,333 people, 5,971 households, and 4,010 families residing in the county. The racial makeup of the county was 61.5% white, 35.9% black or African American, 0.4% American Indian, 0.3% Asian, 0.1% Pacific islander, 0.6% from other races, and 1.2% from two or more races. Those of Hispanic or Latino origin made up 1.6% of the population. In terms of ancestry, 11.4% were Irish, 6.5% were English, 6.5% were American, and 6.0% were German.

Of the 5,971 households, 28.2% had children under the age of 18 living with them, 47.5% were married couples living together, 14.7% had a female householder with no husband present, 32.8% were non-families, and 28.4% of all households were made up of individuals. The average household size was 2.39 and the average family size was 2.91. The median age was 44.4 years.

The median income for a household in the county was $39,075 and the median income for a family was $51,765. Males had a median income of $35,473 versus $25,607 for females. The per capita income for the county was $20,964. About 11.2% of families and 16.6% of the population were below the poverty line, including 24.7% of those under age 18 and 13.3% of those ages of 65 or over.

The 2020 United States Census indicated that the county lost 23% of its population in the preceding decade.

2020 census

As of the 2020 United States census, there were 10,975 people, 6,042 households, and 4,065 families residing in the county.

Communities

City
 Darien (county seat)

Unincorporated communities
 Crescent
 Eulonia
 Townsend
 Valona

Notable people
 Thomas Spalding (March 25, 1774 – January 5, 1851) United States Representative
 John McIntosh Kell (1823 - October 5, 1900) Executive Officer of the CSS Alabama
 Charles S. Thomas (December 6, 1849 – June 24, 1934)  United States Senator for Colorado
 Arthur Conley (January 4, 1946 – November 17, 2003) soul singer
 Allen Bailey (March 25, 1989 – ) Defensive end for Kansas City Chiefs

Politics

See also

 Fort King George
 Fort Barrington
 National Register of Historic Places listings in McIntosh County, Georgia
List of counties in Georgia

References

External links
 McIntosh County website
 History of McIntosh County
 Historical Markers in McIntosh County
 McIntosh County Shouters

 
Georgia (U.S. state) counties
1793 establishments in Georgia (U.S. state)
Brunswick metropolitan area
Gullah country
Populated places established in 1793